Moh Amanullah Khan served as the Member of the Legislative Assembly for Chandrayangutta constituency in Andhra Pradesh, India, between 1978 and 1999. They switch political allegiance on several occasions, being an independent candidate in 1978, 1983 and 1985 before representing the All India Majlis-e-Ittehadul Muslimeen in 1989 and then being a Majlis Bachao Tehreek candidate in 1994.

References

Andhra Pradesh MLAs 1978–1983
Politicians from Hyderabad, India
Year of birth missing
Possibly living people
Andhra Pradesh MLAs 1983–1985
Andhra Pradesh MLAs 1985–1989
Andhra Pradesh MLAs 1989–1994
Andhra Pradesh MLAs 1994–1999